Toolbox is the second solo album by Ian Gillan originally released only in Europe, Japan and Brazil on the German label EastWest. It was his last album before his second comeback with Deep Purple in August 1992. The subsequent 10-month tour, which crossed Europe and South America, proved Gillan to be a strong live attraction. Although Toolbox was not a big commercial success, it is considered by many as one of Gillan's finest records. The album was released in the US in 1998 by Eagle Records.

Track listing

Personnel
 Ian Gillan – lead vocals
 Steve Morris – guitar
 Brett Bloomfield – bass guitar
 Leonard Haze – drums

Guest musicians
 Leslie West – guitar on "Hang Me Out To Dry"

Production notes
 Recorded at Battery Studios, London, 1991
 Produced, engineered and mixed by Chris Tsangarides.

References

1991 albums
Ian Gillan albums
Albums produced by Chris Tsangarides
East West Records albums